Nicrophorus przewalskii is a burying beetle described by Semenov-Tian-Shanskij in 1894.

References

Silphidae
Beetles of North America
Beetles described in 1894
Taxa named by Andrey Semyonov-Tyan-Shansky